Paul Howard Carr (September 4, 1931 - February 18, 2006) was an American football player who played in the NFL for the San Francisco 49ers from 1955 to 1957 for a total of 30 career games.

References

1931 births
2006 deaths
San Francisco 49ers players
American football defensive backs
Houston Cougars football players
Players of American football from Los Angeles